The World War I Monument is a war memorial by an unknown creator, installed outside the Heritage Society, adjacent to Houston's Sam Houston Park, in the U.S. state of Texas.

The bronze and granite memorial commemorates local soldiers who died in World War I, and features a bronze plaque depicting an eagle and displaying a list of names, set within a granite block.

See also
 List of public art in Houston
 World War II Memorial (Houston)

References

Birds in art
Bronze sculptures in Texas
Granite sculptures in Texas
Monuments and memorials in Texas
Outdoor sculptures in Houston
World War I memorials in the United States